Manuel Aguilar may refer to:
 Manuel Ángel Aguilar Belda (born 1949), Spanish politician
 Manuel Aguilar y Bustamante (1750–1819), Salvadorian ecclesiastic
 Manuel Aguilar Chacón (1797–1846), head of state of Costa Rica from April 1837 to March 1838